The Vivi is a river in Krasnoyarsk Krai, Russia. It is a right hand tributary of the Nizhnyaya Tunguska.

A damaged An-2 aircraft was discovered in the area of the river Vivi on 28 July 2011.

Course
The Vivi has its source where the southern limit of the Putorana Plateau overlaps with the Syverma Plateau. It begins at the southern end of Lake Vivi and is fast-flowing with many rapids. The Vivi flows roughly southeastwards across the Syverma Plateau in a very remote area where there are very rarely any people.
The Vivi joins the right bank of the Nizhnyaya Tunguska near where the latter flows west into the eastern side of the Tunguska Plateau.

The Logancha meteorite crater is also located in the Vivi basin.

See also
List of rivers of Russia

References

External links
Fishing in Russia
Rivers of Krasnoyarsk Krai